This is a list of the symbols of the states and union territories of India. Each state and union territory has a unique set of official symbols, usually a state emblem, an animal, a bird, a flower and a tree. A second animal (fish, butterfly, reptile, aquatic animal, heritage animal) sometimes appears, as do fruits and other plants, and there are some state songs and state mottos.

States

Andhra Pradesh

Arunachal Pradesh

Assam

Bihar

Chhattisgarh

Goa

Gujarat

Haryana

Himachal Pradesh

Jharkhand

Karnataka

Kerala

Madhya Pradesh

Maharashtra

Manipur

Meghalaya

Mizoram

Nagaland

Odisha

Punjab

Rajasthan

Sikkim

Tamil Nadu

Telangana

Tripura

Uttar Pradesh

Uttarakhand

West Bengal

Union territories

Andaman and Nicobar Islands

Chandigarh

Dadra and Nagar Haveli and Daman and Diu

Delhi

Jammu and Kashmir

Ladakh

Lakshadweep

Puducherry

Autonomous administrative divisions

Some of the autonomous administrative divisions established by the Sixth Schedule of the Constitution of India have also adopted official symbols.

Bodoland Territorial Region

See also
 National symbols of India
 List of Indian state flags
 List of Indian state emblems
 List of Indian state mottos
 List of Indian state songs
 List of Indian state foundation days
 List of Indian state animals
 List of Indian state birds
 List of Indian state flowers
 List of Indian state trees

References

General references
102-Journal de Kanpur Vol-3/ year 2018
GSV Journalism Research Center.India.Kanpur

External links
  Knowindia.gov.in:  States and Union Territories Symbols

 
 
Indian coats of arms